The Battle of Mytilene may refer to:
 Battle of Mytilene (406 BC), fought between Athens and Sparta 
 Battle of Mytilene (427 BC), fought between Mytilene and Athens
 Battle of Mytilene (1457), naval battle between the Roman Catholic Church under Ludovico Trevisan and the Ottoman Empire
 Battle of Mytilene (1690), naval battle between a Venetian fleet under Daniele Dolphin and a combined Muslim fleet